Po čem muži touží (translated as What Men Want) is a 2018 Czech comedy film directed by Rudolf Havlík.

Plot
The movie tells the story of a charismatic and self-confident man, Karel Král. At first sight a successful man, a bit chauvinist maybe, but still very popular with women, though in fact struggling in his personal life. He argues with his former wife over his 17-year-old daughter, who hates him because of the way he leads his life.

And one day, the consequences of his behaviour finally take effect. He loses his job because of several mistakes and a consequent decline in the number of the sold magazines, he gets into a fight with his former wife and daughter again, a woman crashes his car and for his position of editor-in-chief is hired young and beautiful Leona. Karel and his best friend Čestmír decide to solve it in a typical way - they get drunk and during the wild night, he expresses a wish to become a woman and in the morning, he wakes up in his former wife’s body.

Soundtrack
The film also features The Silver Spoons first official single "He´s Got My Money Now" which after being released instantly became a radio sensation in the Czech Republic and enabled them to win Best New Artist of the year at the IREPORT Music Awards.

Cast
 Tatiana Pauhofová as Leona
 Jiří Langmajer as Karel
 Anna Polívková as Karla
 Matěj Hádek as Čestmír
 Sara Sandeva as Julie

References

External links
 

2018 films
2018 comedy films
2010s Czech-language films
Czech comedy films